Journey to Love is the third solo album by jazz fusion bassist Stanley Clarke.

Track listing 
All tracks composed by Stanley Clarke; except where indicated

"Silly Putty" * (4:52)
"Journey to Love" (4:52)
"Hello Jeff" (5:16)
"Song to John, Part 1" (Clarke, Chick Corea) (4:22)
"Song to John, Part 2" (Clarke, Corea) (6:09)
"Concerto for Jazz/Rock Orchestra, Parts 1-4" (14:25)
(* The first few seconds of "Silly Putty" are missing from all CD releases of the album.)

Personnel
 Stanley Clarke – bass guitar, double bass, organ, piccolo bass, bells, gong, vocals
 Chick Corea – piano on "Song to John"
 George Duke – keyboards, bells, vocals
 Jeff Beck – electric guitar on "Hello Jeff" and guitar solo on "Journey to Love"
 John McLaughlin – acoustic guitar on "Song to John"
 David Sancious – electric guitar, 12–string guitar
 Jon Faddis – trumpet
 Alan Rubin – trumpet
 Lew Soloff – trumpet
 Tom Malone – trombone
 David Taylor – trombone
 Earl Chapin – brass horn
 John Clark – brass horn
 Peter Gordon – brass horn
 Wilmer Wise – brass horn
 Steve Gadd – drums, percussion
 Lenny White – drums on "Hello Jeff"

References

1975 albums
Stanley Clarke albums
Albums produced by Ken Scott
Epic Records albums
Albums recorded at Electric Lady Studios
Albums produced by Stanley Clarke
Jazz-funk albums